This is a list of Natural Resources Conservation Areas (NRCAs), part of the Washington Natural Areas Program managed by Washington Department of Natural Resources.

Clallam County

 Shipwreck Point NRCA: This site includes one of the last, easily accessible, open stretches of beach on the Strait of Juan de Fuca. 

Clark County

 Lacamas Prairie Natural Area: This combined natural area preserve (NAP) and natural resources conservation area (NRCA) protects the best known remnant of the Willamette Valley wet prairie ecosystem in Washington. 
 Washougal Oaks Natural Area: This combined NAP/NRCA: protects the largest high-quality Oregon white oak woodland in western Washington. 

Cowlitz County

 Merrill Lake NRCA: This site contains a mixed conifer/hardwood forest along a shoreline, providing habitat for birds of prey. 

Grays Harbor County

 Elk River NRCA: This area is the largest, highest quality estuarine system remaining in Washington or Oregon. 

Jefferson County

 Clearwater Corridor NRCA: This site represents a mature coastal forest, protects aquatic-riparian habitat and provides elk habitat. 
 Devils Lake NRCA: This NRCA: contains two freshwater wetlands and two sphagnum bog communities. 
 South Nolan NRCA: This area is an old-growth temperate forest with scattered wetlands. Some trees are more than 500 years old. 

King County

 Middle Fork Snoqualmie NRCA: This area protects old growth Douglas-fir forest, subalpine lands, mid-elevation lakes, and habitat for marbled murrelet, northern spotted owl and native mountain goat. 
 Rattlesnake Mountain Scenic Area: This area protects cliff terrain, wildlife habitat, numerous riparian systems and old growth forest. 
 Mount Si NRCA: This NRCA: supports a variety of wildlife including native mountain goats, cougar and black bear. 
 West Tiger Mountain NRCA: This NRCA: provides important habitat for large and small wildlife including reptiles and amphibians. 

Kitsap County

 Stavis NRCA: This natural area includes the best known quality example of the Douglas-fir–western hemlock/evergreen huckleberry forest community, and one of the only extensive mature and old growth forests in the Puget Sound lowlands. 

Klickitat County

 Klickitat Canyon NRCA: This NRCA has views of the Klickitat River, and is home to a variety of wildlife species. 
 White Salmon Oak NRCA: This site represents of all of the Oregon white oak communities found in the White Salmon River drainage. 

Lewis County

 Tahoma Forest NRCA: This site protects the ecological value of a structurally complex old growth forest. 

Okanogan County

 Loomis NRCA: This NRCA: protects twelve plant species of concern, as well as important habitat for nine wildlife species. 

Pacific County

 Ellsworth Creek NRCA: This preserve provides important breeding habitat for the federally threatened marbled murrelet. 
 South Nemah NRCA: This site contains western red cedar and Sitka spruce and habitat for marbled murrelets and spotted owls. 
 Teal Slough NRCA: This site supports a remnant coastal old growth forest and is home to marbled murrelets and spotted owls.
 Naselle Highlands NRCA: This site contains mature conifer forest habitat including platform trees that support marbled murrelet nesting sites.

Pierce County

 Ashford NRCA: This site protects mature, structurally complex conifer forest and helps provide habitat for northern spotted owls.  

San Juan County

 Cattle Point NRCA: This NRCA: is an important research site with a day use recreation and interpretive area. .

Skagit County

 Cypress Island NRCA: This is the last largely undeveloped island in the San Juans, providing a reminder of pre-settlement Washington. 
 Granite Lakes NRCA: This area contains 160-year old stands of silver fir, mountain hemlock and associated plant communities. 
 Hat Island NRCA: This conservation area provides habitat for bald eagles, sea and shore birds. 

Skamania County

 Table Mountain NRCA: This area contains relatively undisturbed upland and wetland forests, mountain meadows, and rare plants. 
 Stevenson Ridge NRCA: This area includes structurally complex, old-growth conifer forest that serves as nesting habitat for the northern spotted owl, federally listed as "endangered."

Snohomish County

 Morning Star NRCA: This NRCA: features low to high elevation terrain; meadows, forests, and exposed rocks and cliffs. .

Spokane County

 Dishman Hills NRCA: This site is notable for dramatically sculpted terrain left by the floods which issued from Glacial Lake Missoula. 

Thurston County

 Woodard Bay NRCA: This site protects habitat ranging from shoreline to wetlands to mature second-growth forest. 

Wahkiakum County

 Hendrickson Canyon NRCA: This site contains the county's last high quality, mature and old growth western hemlock forest. 
 Skamokawa Creek NRCA: This site contains mature conifer forest habitat including platform trees supporting marbled murrelet nesting sites.

Whatcom County

 Lake Louise NRCA: This site includes a very large, active beaver pond and various forest communities. 
 Lummi Island NRCA: This site provides an uneven-aged mixed forest, making it very appealing to birds of prey. 

Yakima County

 Klickitat Canyon NRCA: This NRCA has views of the Klickitat River, and is home to a variety of wildlife species. 

Source:

References

Natural Resources Conservation Areas